Kent House railway station is on the Chatham Main Line in England, serving part of the Penge and Beckenham areas in the London Borough of Bromley, south London. It takes its name from the nearby Kent House farm, the first house in the historic county of Kent after crossing the Surrey border.

The station and most trains that call are operated by Southeastern, as part of the Bromley South Metro service, while a limited number of Thameslink services also call. Kent House is in Travelcard Zone 4.

History
The line was opened by the London, Chatham and Dover Railway (LCDR) on 1 July 1863, but the station was not opened until 1 October 1884 and was originally named Kent House (Beckenham). It lies above street level, where the booking office is situated; there is a subway and stairs to the platforms.

On 3 February 1993, an IRA bomb was detonated on a train at the station that was travelling from Victoria to Ramsgate. A warning had been given and everybody was safely evacuated before the explosion but the damage to the carriage was considerable.

Services
All services at Kent House are operated by Southeastern using  and  EMUs.

The typical off-peak service in trains per hour is:
 2 tph to 
 2 tph to  via 

During the peak hours, additional services between London Victoria and Bromley South call at the station increasing the service to 4 tph in each direction, as well as trains between London Blackfriars and Beckenham Junction.

Platform 2 is signalled with a turnback facility in the London direction, though currently no services start or terminate at this station.

Connections
London Buses routes 194, 227 and 358 and night route N3 serve the station.

 station on the Hayes Line (formerly the Mid-Kent Line) is a short walk from this station, and has trains between London Charing Cross/Cannon Street and Hayes, which are also operated by Southeastern.

Beckenham Road tram stop is 5 minutes walking distance.

References

External links 

Beckenham History

Railway stations in the London Borough of Bromley
Former London, Chatham and Dover Railway stations
Railway stations in Great Britain opened in 1884
Railway stations served by Southeastern